Lumbini Province, formerly Province No. 5, is one of the seven federal provinces of Nepal established by the country's new constitution of 20 September 2015, comprising twelve districts, namely Arghakhanchi, Banke, Bardiya, Dang, Eastern Rukum, Gulmi, Kapilvastu, Parasi, Palpa, Pyuthan, Rolpa and Rupandehi. There are many categorized monuments sites in Lumbini Province.

Lists per district of Lumbini Province
 List of monuments in Arghakhanchi District
 List of monuments in Banke District
 List of monuments in Bardiya District
 List of monuments in Dang District
 List of monuments in Eastern Rukum District (see list of monuments in the former Rukum District)
 List of monuments in Gulmi District
 List of monuments in Kapilvastu District
 List of monuments in Palpa District
 List of monuments in Parasi District (see list of monuments in the former Nawalparasi District)
 List of monuments in Pyuthan District
 List of monuments in Rolpa District
 List of monuments in Rupandehi District

References 

Lumbini Province
 
Tourist attractions in Lumbini Province